The beach volleyball tournaments, for the 2013 Bolivarian Games in Trujillo, starts on the 16 and ends on 29 November 2013. The beach volleyball competition takes place at Huanchaco Beach, in the Huanchaco Island in Trujillo.

Medal table

Medalists

See also
Volleyball at the 2013 Bolivarian Games

References

Events at the 2013 Bolivarian Games
2013 in beach volleyball
2013 Bolivarian Games